Joan Ann Hackett (March 1, 1934 – October 8, 1983) was an American actress of film, stage, and television. She starred in the 1967 western Will Penny. She was nominated for the Academy Award for Best Supporting Actress and won the Golden Globe Award for Best Supporting Actress for the 1981 film Only When I Laugh. She also starred as Christine Mannon in the 1978 PBS miniseries version of Mourning Becomes Electra.

Early life
She was born in the East Harlem neighborhood of New York City, the daughter of John and Mary (née Esposito) Hackett, and grew up in Elmhurst, Queens, where she became a model and dropped out during her final year of high school. She had a sister, Theresa, and a brother, John. Her mother was from Naples, Italy, and her father had Irish ancestry, and they raised her Catholic and sent her to Catholic schools.

Acting career
 
Hackett debuted in 1959 with the role of Gail Prentiss in the television series, Young Doctor Malone. In 1961, she won a Theatre World Award, an Obie Award for Best Actress, and a Drama Desk Award for her Off-Broadway portrayal of Chris in Michael Shurtleff's play Call Me By My Rightful Name.

She had a recurring role in the CBS legal drama The Defenders (1961–1965) as the fiancée of Kenneth Preston (played by Robert Reed), partner in the father-and-son law firm led by patriarch Lawrence Preston (E.G. Marshall). She appeared regularly in scenes with both lead actors. She had a leading role in The Twilight Zone episode "A Piano in the House". In the 1963–1964 season, she guest-starred on Channing, an ABC drama about college life starring Jason Evers and Henry Jones.

Hackett had one of the starring roles in the 1966 Sidney Lumet film The Group, along with Candice Bergen, Larry Hagman, Richard Mulligan, Joanna Pettet, and others.

One of her notable film performances was the role of Catherine Allen, a young mother struggling to survive on the frontier, in the 1968 Western Will Penny, with Charlton Heston in the title role. Hackett also had notable parts in the classic Western comedy Support Your Local Sheriff!, with James Garner, and the 1973 murder mystery The Last of Sheila. After this, she primarily had parts in TV movies and on episodes of TV series.

She received top billing in the 1974 adaption of Michael Crichton's book The Terminal Man, where she played the brilliant Dr. Janet Ross, a psychiatrist who accurately predicts her patient's destructive behavior, opposite actors George Segal, Donald Moffat, and Richard Dysart. 

In 1978, she appeared in a PBS adaptation of Mourning Becomes Electra as Christine Mannon. Her performance in that production earned her some of the best reviews of her career. Clive James said that it entitled her to be called a great actress. The same year, she was a regular in the cast of the short-lived CBS situation comedy Another Day, portraying Ginny Gardner.

She appeared in the September 22, 1979, episode "Grass Is Always Greener" of The Love Boat as Julie McCoy's former classmate from the line's cruise director course.

Hackett won the Golden Globe Award for Best Supporting Actress - Motion Picture and was nominated for the Academy Award for Best Supporting Actress for her performance in the 1981 film Only When I Laugh, the last film she made before her death. She could also be seen in Paul Simon's 1980 film One Trick Pony.

Personal life and death
 
From 1966 to 1973 she was married to actor Richard Mulligan, who was also cast in The Group.

Hackett was diagnosed with cancer in 1981. She died of ovarian cancer on October 8, 1983, at Encino Hospital in Encino, California. A funeral mass was held on Wednesday, October 12, 1983, at St. Victor Catholic Church in Los Angeles, California. Her remains are entombed in The Abbey of The Psalms Mausoleum at Hollywood Forever Cemetery, where her epitaph reads: "Go Away — I'm Asleep".

Partial filmography
.
 The Group (1966) - Dottie Renfrew Latham
 Will Penny (1967) - Catherine Allen
 Assignment to Kill (1968) - Dominique Laurant
 Support Your Local Sheriff! (1969) - Prudy Perkins
 The Young Country (1970 TV movie) - Clementine Hale
 How Awful About Allan (1970 TV movie) - Olive
 The Other Man (1970 TV movie) - Kathy Maitland
 Five Desperate Women (1971 TV movie) - Dorian
 Rivals (1972) - Christine
 The Last of Sheila (1973) - Lee Parkman
 The Terminal Man (1974) - Dr. Janet Ross
 Reflections of Murder (1974 TV movie) - Claire Elliott
 Mackintosh and T.J. (1975) - Maggie
 Treasure of Matecumbe (1976) - Lauriette Paxton
 Stonestreet: Who Killed the Centerfold Model? (1977) - Jessica Hillard
 Dead of Night (1977) - Mother (segment "Bobby")
 The Possessed (1977 TV movie) - Louise Gelson
 Pleasure Cove (1979 TV movie) - Martha Harrison
 The North Avenue Irregulars (1979) (uncredited)
 The Long Days of Summer (1980 TV movie) - Millie Cooper
 Harnessing the Sun (1980) - Herself
 One Trick Pony (1980) - Lonnie Fox
 Only When I Laugh (1981) - Toby Landau
 The Long Summer of George Adams (1982 TV movie) - Norma Adams
 The Escape Artist (1982) - Aunt Sibyl
 Flicks - Capt. Grace (segment "New Adventures of the Great Galaxy") (1983) (last appearance)

Selected television guest appearances

 1960 Diagnosis: Unknown, in "Gina, Gina" (episode 1.7) September 6
 1961 Alfred Hitchcock Presents, playing "Sylvia" in episode: "Servant Problem" (episode #6.34) June 6
 1962 The New Breed (1961), playing Angie in episode: "Cross the Little Line" (episode #1.15) January 9
 1962 The Twilight Zone (1959), playing "Esther Fortune" in episode: "A Piano in the House" (episode # 3.22), February 16
 1962 Gunsmoke (1955), playing "Mady Arthur" in episode: "The Widow" (episode # 7.25), March 24
 1962 "Theatre '62" (1962), playing the "Second Mrs. de Winter" in episode: "Rebecca" (episode #1.7), April 8
 1963 Combat! (1962), playing "Gabrielle" in episode: "The Chateau" (episode # 1.19), February 12
 1963 Empire (1962), playing Dolores Lanza in episode: "Between Friday and Monday" (episode # 1.31), May 7
 1964 Channing (1963), playing Djuna Phrayne in episode: "A Rich, Famous, Glamorous Folk Singer Like Me" (episode # 1.15), January 8
 1964 The Alfred Hitchcock Hour (1962), playing "Helen Clarvoe" in episode: "Beast in View" (episode # 2.21), March 20
 1965 Bonanza (1959), playing "Margarita Miguel" in episode: "Woman of Fire" (episode # 6.17), January 17
 1966 Run for Your Life (1965), playing Diana Murrow in episode: "The Sex Object" (episode # 2.6), October 17
 1967 Judd, for the Defense (1967), playing Ruth Massey in episode: "The Living Victim" (episode # 1.14), December 15
 1969 Daniel Boone (1964), playing "Theodora Liggett" in episode: "A Pinch of Salt" (episode #5.26), May 1
 1971 Dan August (1970), playing Nancy Williams in "The Assassins" (episode # 1.26), April 8
 1971 Alias Smith and Jones, playing Alice Banion in "The Legacy of Charlie O'Rourke" (episode # 1.15)
 1972 Bonanza (1959), playing "Judith Corman" in episode: "Second Sight" (episode # 13.16), January 9
 1979 $weepstake$ (1979) in episode: ""Vince, Pete and Patsy, Jessica and Rodney"" (episode # 1.3), February 9
 1979 Trapper John, M.D. (1979) playing "Wilma" in episode: "The Surrogate" (episode # 1.10), December 23
 1979 Taxi, playing "Charlotte", the sister of "Alex Reiger" in episode: "Honor Thy Father" (season 2, episode 2) aired on 18 September 1979
 1982  Paper Dolls (1982), playing "Julia Blake" mother of teen model Taryn Blake
 1985 Tales of the Unexpected, playing Brenda in episode: "Scrimshaw" (season 8, episode 4) aired on 28 July 1985

References

External links

 
 
 
 
 Allmovie Review of her episode of The Twilight Zone
 Review of her episode of Combat!
 Allmovie Plot synopsis of her 1965 Bonanza episode

1934 births
1983 deaths
20th-century American actresses
American film actresses
American stage actresses
American television actresses
Best Supporting Actress Golden Globe (film) winners
Burials at Hollywood Forever Cemetery
Deaths from cancer in California
Deaths from ovarian cancer
Drama Desk Award winners
American people of Irish descent
American people of Italian descent
Obie Award recipients
Actresses from New York City
Actresses from Los Angeles
Theatre World Award winners
People from East Harlem
People from Elmhurst, Queens